Charlie Major is a Canadian country music artist. His discography comprises seven studio albums, four greatest hits albums and thirty-two singles.

Studio albums

1990s

2000s and 2010s

Compilation albums

Singles

1990s

2000s and 2010s

Music videos

Notes
A^ 444 peaked at number 21 on the Canadian RPM Country Albums/CDs chart.
B^ "One True Love" peaked at number 31 on the Canadian RPM Country Tracks chart.

References

External Links
 

Discographies of Canadian artists
Country music discographies